Learchis is a genus of sea slugs, specifically of aeolid nudibranchs.

Species
Species in this genus include:
 Learchis evelinae Edmunds & Just, 1983
 Learchis ignis Crescini, De Sisto & Villalba, 2013
 Learchis poica Ev. Marcus & Er. Marcus, 1960

Species treated as synonyms
 Learchis indica Bergh, 1896: synonym of Caloria indica (Bergh, 1896) - type species of Learchis

Validity of the genus
According to Article 42.3. of the International Code of Zoological Nomenclature which states:
Application of genus-group names. The application of each genus-group name is determined by reference to the type species of the nominal taxon that it denotes. 
The species currently allocated here to Learchis should be moved with Learchis indica to the genus Caloria.

References

Facelinidae